The Norway men's national under-21 volleyball team represents Norway in international men's volleyball competitions and friendly matches under the age 21 and it is ruled by the Norwegian Volleyball Federation body that is an affiliate of the Federation of International Volleyball FIVB and also part of the European Volleyball Confederation CEV.

Results

FIVB U21 World Championship
 Champions   Runners up   Third place   Fourth place

European U21 / 20 Championship
 Champions   Runners-up   Third place   4th place

Team

Previous squad
The Following Players Represents Norway in the 2022 European Junior Championship Qualifications

References

External links
Norwegian Volleyball Federation

National men's under-21 volleyball teams
Volleyball
Volleyball in Norway